The idea of the restoration of the monarchy in Romania is a popular idea that has been supported by a fraction of the population of the country ever since the Romanian Revolution. If in 1997, only 7% of Romanians supported this idea, this number increased to 10% in 2002, to 14% in 2007, to 16% in 2008, to 27.2% in 2013 and to 30.2% in 2014. A 2016 poll showed a decrease of support to 21%, followed by a 2018 poll with 37% in favor of the organization of a referendum for the restoration; the latter was shortly after the funeral of Michael I of Romania, the last King of Romania.

Support for a new kingdom in Romania has also been expressed by several public figures. , the executive president of the Social Democratic Party (PSD) at the time, declared in late 2017 that despite identifying himself as a republican, he was not opposed to a referendum on the monarchy being held in Romania, saying that the issue should be discussed as "I saw that there already are many sympathizers in media". In response to this, the Prime Minister of Romania Mihai Tudose said that he could not support this initiative as he was not a monarchist. On the other hand, Călin Popescu-Tăriceanu, the leader of the Alliance of Liberals and Democrats (ALDE) at the time, talked about the possible benefits of having a monarch in Romania. Furthermore, Cristian Diaconescu, former Ministry of Foreign Affairs of Romania, in the face of the 2021 Romanian political crisis, declared "a constitutional monarchy would have managed the crisis better, because only it can guarantee the balance of power".

See also
 Kingdom of Romania
 Nihil sine Deo
 Romanian royal family

References

 
Politics of Romania
Restoration of the monarchy